Regensburg also called Ratisbon in English and Ratisbonne in French, a German city in Bavaria, south-east Germany

Not to be confused with similarly named Regensberg, a Swiss Municipality

Regensburg may also refer to:

Places
Principality of Regensburg, was a principality within the Holy Roman Empire and the Confederation of the Rhine which existed between 1803 and 1810. Its capital was the city of Regensburg, now in Bavaria, Germany
Regensburg (district), a German district
Regensburg (electoral district)
For the district, see . For the similarly named Swiss municipality, see .
University of Regensburg, a public research university located in Regensburg, Bavaria
Regensburg Cathedral, cathedral dedicated to St Peter in Regensburg
Regensburg Synagogue, erected between 1210 and 1227, was an edifice in Old Romanesque style in Regensburg
Theater Regensburg, also known as the Stadttheater Regensburg, theatre of the city of Regensburg

People
Sophy Regensburg (1885–1974), American painter

of Regensburg
Aurelia of Regensburg also known as Aurelia of Ratisbon, (died 1027), an 11th-century Roman Catholic German saint
Bertold of Regensburg (c. 1220–1272), German preacher during the high Middle Ages
Bishops of Regensburg (Ratisbon) are bishops of the Roman Catholic Diocese of Regensburg, Bavaria, Germany. The seat of the bishops is Regensburg Cathedral
Dirmicius of Regensburg, second Abbot of Regensburg, fl. 1121–1133
Emmeram of Regensburg, Christian bishop, martyr and saint
Erhard of Regensburg, bishop of Regensburg in the 7th century and saint. Ancient documents call him also Erard and Herhard.
Judah ben Samuel of Regensburg (1150–1217), also called HeHasid or 'the Pious' in Hebrew, was a leader of the Chassidei Ashkenaz, a movement of Jewish mysticism in Germany
Marianus Scotus of Regensburg, born Muiredach mac Robartaig, an Irish abbot and scribe
Petachiah of Regensburg, also known as Petachiah ben Yakov, Moses Petachiah, and Petachiah of Ratisbon, a Bohemian rabbi of the twelfth and early thirteenth centuries

Others
SSV Jahn Regensburg, a football club in Germany
Regensburg lecture,  or Regensburg address, lecture delivered on 12 September 2006 by Pope Benedict XVI at the University of Regensburg in Germany
SMS Regensburg, a light cruiser of the Graudenz class built by the German Kaiserliche Marine (Imperial Navy)

See also
Diet of Regensburg, referring to any of the sessions of the Imperial Diet, Imperial States, or the prince-electors of the Holy Roman Empire which took place in the Imperial City of Regensburg (Ratisbon), now in Germany
Munich–Regensburg railway, a double track, electrified main line railway, linking Munich and Regensburg
Regensburg-Prüfening station, one of the three railway stations in the German city of Regensburg
Regensburg–Weiden railway, a main line railway, which links the Upper Palatine regional capital of Regensburg via Schwandorf to Weiden in der Oberpfalz 
Regensburg–Passau railway, a key transport link from Germany to Austria and other southeast European countries 
Schweinfurt–Regensburg mission was a strategic bombing mission during World War II
Regensberg (disambiguation), alternative to Regensburg